Wilhelm Herzog (12 January 1884 in Berlin – 4 April 1960 in Munich) was a German historian of literature and culture, dramatist, encyclopedist, and pacifist.

Life 

He studied economics, Germanistics and history of art in Berlin. After publishing works about Lichtenstein (1905) and Heinrich von Kleist (1907), he became the editor of the literary magazine Pan. From 1914 to 1915 and from 1918 to 1929 he wrote for the Forum, a journal advocating global peace. He was also the publisher of the daily newspaper Die Republik from 1918 to 1919. Herzog who was a member of the Independent Social Democratic Party (USPD), with the left wing of which he joined the Communist Party of Germany at the end of 1920 with left-wing of the USPD. Due to a conflict with top KPD official Willi Münzenberg, he was expelled from the Communist Party in 1928.

Between 1929 and 1933, he wrote Die Affäre Dreyfus (The Dreyfus Affair), Der Kampf einer Republik, and Panama. Die Affäre Dreyfus was adapted to English as the 1931 film Dreyfus and as a play by the theatre critic James Agate, having a short run in London as "I Accuse!", in 1937. In 1947 His work "From Dreyfus to Petain: The Struggle of a Republic" was copyrighted.

His main work was a 4 tome encyclopedia, Große Gestalten der Geschichte (Great Figures of History), conceived in the tradition of Diderot's Encyclopédie.

From 1915 to 1921 he was married to German film actress Erna Morena (1885–1962) and had one daughter with her.

Works 
Rund um den Staatsanwalt (1923)
Die Affäre Dreyfus (1928, 1929)
Der Kampf einer Republik (1933)
Panama (1931, changed in 1950)
Hymnen und Pamphlete (1939)
Kritische Enzyklopädie (1949)

External links
 
 
 

1884 births
1960 deaths
German male writers

20th-century German male writers
20th-century German dramatists and playwrights
German magazine editors
Independent Social Democratic Party politicians
Emigrants from Nazi Germany to Switzerland